WGCT-CD, virtual channel 39 (VHF digital channel 8), is a low-powered, Class A TCT-affiliated television station licensed to Columbus, Ohio, United States. The station is owned by the Central Ohio Association of Christian Broadcasters, who also owns WOCB-CD (channel 25) in Marion, WXCB-CA (channel 22) in Delaware and WQIZ-LD (channel 33) in Ashland.

History

W08BV era (1983–1998)
In 1983, the station's construction permit was assigned by the Federal Communications Commission (FCC). The station began broadcasting in 1985, under the callsign of W08BV, as the first low-powered television station in the Columbus media market. For the first years on the air, it has been airing syndicated programming, and it also boasts an in-house sports broadcasting unit. Sports coverage on W08BV included football and basketball games involving more than 30 high schools in the area, mainly in Franklin County. It also held a contract to cover Ohio State Buckeyes women's basketball, women's gymnastics, as well as hockey and wrestling.

WINJ-LP era (1998–2010)
It changed its calls to WINJ-LP (We're INto Jesus) in 1998 and to its current calls in 2006. Prior to the purchase by its current owners, the station showed a variety of programs, the bulk of which were old public-domain movies, old cartoons, and current religious programs. The station was notable for its erratic technical quality, which often imparts a bizarre, disjointed, and surreal texture to the programming; Such as the program "The TV8'S Kid's Fun Fest/Pink Morning Cartoon", which was brought into the spotlight by websites such as YouTube and Reddit. Former owner Ella Flowers (1938-2017) was featured prominently in many of the musical and religious programs.

WGCT-CD era (2010–present)
The station switched to digital on June 13, 2010, and changed its call letters to WGCT-CD. It previously broadcast at 83 watts, but has recently increased its power to 120 watts.

The station is not available on any local cable TV outlets. Even with the power increase, it barely covers the city of Columbus itself.

Digital channels
The station's digital signal is multiplexed:

References

External links
 The Central Ohio Association Of Christian Broadcasters (COACB) site
 TCT site
 Buzzr site
 Daystar site
 Light TV site

GCT-CD
Television channels and stations established in 1983
Low-power television stations in the United States